Victoria Park is a park and sports ground in the Auckland city centre, New Zealand. It was opened in 1905 and named after the queen who had died four years earlier. It lies on reclaimed bay land in Freemans Bay, a suburb directly west of the Auckland CBD. However, it does not have direct connection to the foreshore anymore, as the Western Reclamation and the Viaduct Basin quarter lie between it and the Waitematā Harbour. The bay started to be filled in as early as the 1870s although the bulk of the reclamation appears to have happened after 1901. The Park was 'finished' around 1912, the area to the north (called the Western Reclamation) dates from after that.

The artificial creation of the land is why it is very flat and level - it was intended from the start to be primarily a facility for active events augmenting the other public parks; Western Park 1876 and Albert Park 1884 which were for more genteel passive enjoyment. For this reason the park was not laid out in a picturesque manner, neither has it ever had decorative flower beds.

As a sports facility for the adjacent working class areas and industrial zones it was provided with a sports pavilion and edged with trees to give shade for spectators. These are London plane trees (planted in 1905 for the opening of the park), which provide an oval frame for the sports fields in the middle. Asphalt sealed tennis courts were created in 1909.

On the north side of the park was constructed a caretakers residence designed as an Arts & Crafts cottage (also recently restored as a cafe), a cricket pavilion (rebuilt in the 1990s) and a band rotunda (demolished before the Second War). As well as being home to cricket and rugby clubs, newer activities have found a place in the park; jogging for example. In the 1990s a skateboard park was created along with a petanque court.

On the south side space was also found a line of small commercial buildings facing towards the Municipal Incinerator (opened 1905). Next to these was built a Free Kindergarten - paid for by Sir John Logan Campbell, a former Mayor of Auckland; this building is the only survivor of the line of buildings which stood on the southern edge of the park and has been recently restored. Not far from the Kindergarten was created a playground for smaller children in 1912. The original equipment was imported from America and paid for by John Court the proprietor of a well known Queen Street department store. This facility has been recently renovated with up-to date modern equipment.

At the beginning of the 20th century this was an extremely insalubrious area; to the west was located the Auckland Gas Company with its gas holders, to the south the Municipal Rubbish Incinerator and the Municipal Abattoir, to the east, several timber yards, shipyards, foundries, tanneries and a paper mill. All of these industries produced noise and pollution, releasing toxic fumes, dust and dangerous chemicals & acids into the air and water. On the reclaimed land north of the park created in the 1920s were more sources of pollution. Here were located fish processing plants, more timber and ship yards, the Oil Storage Depots and Dangerous Goods Stores on Wynyard Wharf.

Moreover, the earth used to fill in the bay to create the park was not clean. Although it is unlikely it ever included much night soil (human excrement) the ground was created using builders spoil from construction sites throughout the city along with much unidentifiable 'rubbish', probably including many fragments of lead paint. Over the years this material has undoubtedly been inundated with leakage of chemicals from the adjacent industries; arsenic and cyanide from the timber yards for example. This means the ground soil of the park (ironically intended as a healthy place and a refuge from the surrounding noise and pollution) is itself contaminated. To mitigate this the playground was recently reconstructed over an impermeable layer to stop emissions of toxic gasses from the ground.

Urban expansion and traffic needs have not bypassed the park; as well as being bordered by some of the busier Auckland arterials on the north (Fanshawe Street) and south (Victoria Street), in the 1960s a large four lane viaduct was imposed on the park to allow State Highway 1 to pass overhead and connect to the Auckland Harbour Bridge. In order to reduce any further degradation of the Park's landscape recently a four-lane tunnel has been constructed under the western part of the park parallel to the viaduct to provide more traffic movement with a minimum of impact to the park itself.

Major close-by attractions are the Victoria Park Market, the former City rubbish incinerator (once known as the Destructor) built in 1905 and now housing an arts & crafts market and several entertainment venues. The market has received a major makeover, which has seen many of the older buildings of the complex restored (and some of the smaller stores merged for larger tenancies). There are plans to relocate the carpark on the northern end of the site underground and to construct an apartment block over it.

To the south of the Park is Freemans Bay which the park was largely intended to service. This was a working class area filled with numerous small, badly built houses jammed up against various industrial buildings, hence the reason for creating a green space for local residents. Since the creation of the Motorway and Viaduct in the 1960s most of the Freemans Bay seems cut off from Victoria Park (and vice versa). It has remained residential, and its main street, Franklin Road, is now one of the more desirable residential addresses of central Auckland.

The portion to the east of the motorway is still directly connected with Victoria Park. It has changed substantially, with all the residential buildings long gone. Largely composed of industrial buildings which are now being replaced or retrofitted as residential accommodation, the Park will play an increasingly important role in the area. This eastern portion of Freemans Bay (centred on Victoria Street) has become relabeled as The Victoria Quarter while the area directly to the west of the park, technically part of St Mary's Bay is now becoming known as The Beaumont Quarter, the former Gas Works on Beaumont Street having been decontaminated and renovated as a residential development.

The suburb also has New World Victoria Park at the bottom of Franklin Road, which until a few years ago was the only large supermarket in the CBD, three more supermarkets have since been added to serve the growing inner city apartment population, while Westhaven Marina, the Viaduct Basin and the new Wynyard Quarter lye close by to the north. To the east is located Skycity, to the west at the top of College Hill Road is located Three Lamps.

The Victoria Park Sports and Cultural Trust (VPS&CT) oversees the use of the cricket pavilion.  The VPS&CT is made up of trustees representing the users of the pavilion and the playing fields of Victoria Park, these include the Grafton United Cricket Club, the Auckland Football Referees Association and the Auckland and District Pipe Band. The current Trustees representing the Grafton United Cricket Club are Stewart Wilson, Nick Albrecht and Alastair Lee.

Demographics

Victoria Park had a population of 2,070 at the 2018 New Zealand census, an increase of 696 people (50.7%) since the 2013 census, and an increase of 1,020 people (97.1%) since the 2006 census. There were 981 households, comprising 1,116 males and 954 females, giving a sex ratio of 1.17 males per female. The median age was 28.7 years (compared with 37.4 years nationally), with 132 people (6.4%) aged under 15 years, 1,026 (49.6%) aged 15 to 29, 858 (41.4%) aged 30 to 64, and 51 (2.5%) aged 65 or older.

Ethnicities were 32.3% European/Pākehā, 3.2% Māori, 2.9% Pacific peoples, 59.1% Asian, and 8.0% other ethnicities. People may identify with more than one ethnicity.

The percentage of people born overseas was 76.5, compared with 27.1% nationally.

Although some people chose not to answer the census's question about religious affiliation, 49.4% had no religion, 19.4% were Christian, 0.1% had Māori religious beliefs, 14.5% were Hindu, 4.3% were Muslim, 2.2% were Buddhist and 4.6% had other religions.

Of those at least 15 years old, 933 (48.1%) people had a bachelor's or higher degree, and 57 (2.9%) people had no formal qualifications. The median income was $37,800, compared with $31,800 nationally. 378 people (19.5%) earned over $70,000 compared to 17.2% nationally. The employment status of those at least 15 was that 1,161 (59.9%) people were employed full-time, 228 (11.8%) were part-time, and 105 (5.4%) were unemployed.

History

The following information is mostly derived from an Auckland City timeline:

The public park was first mooted at a Council meeting in 1884
Officially opened in 1905 by the mayor Arthur Myers
The first grandstand pavilion was opened in 1906.
It has been the home ground of the Ponsonby Ponies rugby league club since their foundation in 1908.
In 1909 Asphalt tennis courts were created followed by bowling greens, croquet lawns and a playground added later. In 1907 and 1911 and 1911 the park was also extended both west and east.
In 1910 'Campbell Free Kindergarten' opens in the western part of the park, with funds from Sir Logan Campbell and Lady Campbell. This building was later used by a sports club, and is owned by Auckland City Council, but fell into disrepair and has not had a tenant for two decades as of 2010, crumbling aways slowly. However, in June 2010 it was announced that NZ Transport Agency and Council had reached an agreement whereby some Vic Park Tunnel control equipment would be housed in a refurbished building provided as a legacy feature, with a 100-people occupancy community space on the ground floor.
In 1912 the playground received equipment donated by John Court. Court owned a major Department Store on Queen Street and made many contributions to Auckland, including presenting the Zoo with an elephant.
Victoria Park was the site if the first ever match of international rugby league played on New Zealand soil when Great Britain played against the New Zealand Maori team on 20 July 1910 as part of their first ever tour of Australasia.

During the 1918 flu pandemic the park was used as an open air depot forthestorage of the bodies of the many hundreds who died. The Pavilion was used as a temporary morgue. From here the bodies were transported to the Railway Station at the bottom of Queen Street and sent on to Waikumete Cemetery in West Auckland where they were interred in a series of mass graves.
During the Second World War, the park was used for accommodation of US Armed Forces and covered with temporary huts. In the early 1950s, the park escaped closure and industrial redevelopment after it was decided that the facility was of regional use and the provision of parks in the outer suburbs would not suffice to replace it.
In 1960, the kindergarten moved to Tahuna Street, and the vacated building was occupied jointly by Grafton United Cricket Club, Ponsonby Soccer Club and the Pipe Band. The building was later abandoned (around the 1980s, by the late 2000s the building was derelict - now renovated in 2011).
In 1962 the State Highway 1 motorway extension through the park (on an elevated roadway) becomes the first completed section of the inner city transport plan. Later plans to widen the viaduct (which by now is the narrowest part of the motorway in the Auckland area) meet resistance, as it is feared that this would further despoil the park it bisects. Currently (2007), the plan is for a tunnel to be built underneath the park to carry the additional lanes.
In 1989 Auckland City receives ownership of Victoria Park from the Auckland Harbour Board, exchanging it for stub roads used for wharf access in Viaduct Basin.
In 1993 the Victoria Park Sports and Cultural Trust was formed.

Viaduct and Tunnel

The Victoria Park Viaduct was constructed in 1962 to carry the Auckland Northern Motorway over the park. By the early 2000s, the four-lane viaduct had become a major bottleneck. The Victoria Park Tunnel was constructed, largely under the park, to provide a further three lanes. There is also talk of a future tunnel from a second harbour crossing underneath the Tank Farm possibly joining the motorway near the southern side of the park.

References

External links
Photographs of Victoria Park held in Auckland Libraries' heritage collections.

1905 establishments in New Zealand
Urban public parks
Parks in Auckland
Rugby league stadiums in New Zealand
Auckland cricket grounds
Auckland CBD